This is a List of Highways in Hobart, Tasmania.

Highways
  Brooker Highway
  Channel Highway (Kingston Bypass)
  Domain Highway
  East Derwent Highway
  Huon Highway
  Lyell Highway
  Midland Highway (Brighton Bypass)
  South Arm Highway
  Southern Outlet
  Tasman Highway

Major Roads
  Algona Road
  Davey Street
  Goodwood Road
  Macquarie Street
  Sandy Bay Road

See also

References

Highways in Hobart
Highways
Highways
Highways in Hobart